"Method of Modern Love" is a song by the American duo Daryl Hall & John Oates. It was released as the second single from their 1984 album, Big Bam Boom. The song reached number five on the Billboard Hot 100 in February 1985.

Billboard said that Hall & Oates "pop-r&b style renews its freshness and interest."

Music video
The setting and the mood of the music video is kept very surreal, almost dream-like.  At the beginning, Hall and Oates are discovered in their cozy apartment by someone on the roof, looking through a skylight. G. E. Smith throws a V-style guitar through the window, as if it were a spear.  The guitar sticks into the floor and then begins glowing.  This incites Hall and Oates to go up to the roof to investigate. There, on the roof of the apartment, they become mesmerized by a four-man band, and then all the men perform a choreography.  While performing Daryl Hall falls from the roof, and the other men rush to see what became of him.  There, they see him dancing on the clouds next to the moon, and upon Hall's beckoning, they dive off the roof in an attempt to walk on the clouds.  At the end, they are seen swimming and dancing in the clouds, with neon signs flashing the letters of the song title.

The version of the song used in the video is a special edit, which incorporates both the album version and the 12" remix version.

Chart performance
The song entered the Billboard Hot 100 when "Out of Touch" was still on the top of the chart; it debuted at #50 for the week ending December 15. After eight weeks it peaked at #5 staying there for a week; the single remained on the chart for 19 weeks. Curiously, on the January 19, 1985, issue this song was at #21 while the aforementioned Out of Touch was at #22.

On the Radio & Records airplay chart the song debuted at #38 on the December 14, 1984, issue; after four weeks it reached and peaked at #5 staying there for two weeks; the song was on the top 10 of the chart for five weeks and remained on it for 10 weeks.

Chart positions

In popular culture
In 1985, "Weird Al" Yankovic included the song in his polka medley "Hooked on Polkas" from his album Dare to Be Stupid.
In 1993, rapper Method Man interpolated the hook on the song "Method Man".

References

1984 songs
1985 singles
Hall & Oates songs
Songs written by Daryl Hall
Songs written by Janna Allen
Song recordings produced by Bob Clearmountain
RCA Records singles